Palais de danse may refer to:

 Palais de danse (film), a 1928 British film directed by Maurice Elvey
 Palais de Danse, St Kilda, a dance hall in St Kilda, Melbourne, Victoria, Australia
 Palais de Danse, Adelaide, a floating dance venue near Elder Park in Adelaide, Australia
 Palais de Danse, Nottingham